David F. Sellers (February 4, 1874 – January 27, 1949) was an admiral in the United States Navy. He was the first person from New Mexico to graduate from the United States Naval Academy.

Biography

David Foote Sellers was a native of Austin, Texas. He joined the United States Navy in 1890 and was appointed to the U.S. Naval Academy from New Mexico. Sellers graduated in 1894, the first from New Mexico to graduate from the Academy, standing fifth in his class of 47. During the Spanish–American War he participated in the Samoan Campaign and the Philippine–American War while serving aboard the New York. Following his destroyer service he was assigned shore duty at the Bureau of Navigation, was a Naval Aide to the White House and then served on the staff of the Commander-In-Chief, United States Asiatic Fleet, Rear Admiral William S. Cowles.

From 1918 through the end of First World War, he commanded the transport . Sellers was awarded the Navy Cross for his service during that war. Following the war, he served as Naval Aide to Secretary of the Navy Edwin C. Denby. He commanded the battleship  from 1922 until 1923.

Sellers was promoted to rear admiral in 1927 and served as Commander, Special Service Squadron during the Nicaraguan Uprising. Following his service with the squadron he served as Judge Advocate General of the Navy from 1929 until 1931. Then Commander, Battleship Division One from 1931–1932. In 1932 he was promoted to vice admiral and was assigned as Commander, Battleships Battle Force, United States Fleet. He was promoted to Admiral on June 10, 1933, and assigned as Commander-in-Chief United States Fleet and continued to serve until June 18, 1934. In 1934 he was reassigned as Superintendent of the U.S. Naval Academy and served in this capacity until his retirement.

He retired March 1, 1938. He died in 1949 and was buried in Arlington National Cemetery.

Personal life
In 1905, he married Anita Clay Evans (1877–1954), the daughter of Henry Clay Evans.

Namesake
 , a guided missile destroyer, was named in his honor.

See also

 List of United States Navy four-star admirals

References
 Arlington National Cemetery
 http://www.quarterdeck.org/book/cencoms/sellers.html
 https://web.archive.org/web/20080328061904/http://www.jag.navy.mil/AboutUs/AboutUs3.htm

United States Navy admirals
United States Naval Academy alumni
Judge Advocates General of the United States Navy
1874 births
1949 deaths
Recipients of the Navy Cross (United States)
Recipients of the Navy Distinguished Service Medal
Burials at Arlington National Cemetery
Superintendents of the United States Naval Academy